Liam Rowe is an Australian rules football umpire who has officiated in the Australian Football League.

Before umpiring in the AFL, he umpired in the North East Australian Football League, officiating in the 2013 Grand Final. He was appointed to the AFL rookie list in 2014, and made his debut, as an emergency umpire replacing an injured Scott Jeffery, in a match between Greater Western Sydney and Fremantle in Round 22, 2016. He left the AFL rookie list at the end of the 2017 season.

References

Living people
Australian Football League umpires
Year of birth missing (living people)